Salad Days is the twelfth solo album by Adrian Belew, originally released on February 9, 1999. It is a collection of acoustic recordings old and new.

The album consists primarily of acoustic reworkings of Belew's own songs along with three King Crimson songs and two sonic collages, the latter being the only tracks exclusive to this album. All other tracks were compiled from the albums The Acoustic Adrian Belew and Belew Prints: The Acoustic Adrian Belew, Vol. 2, or the sessions thereof.

Reviews
AcousticMagnet (4/99-5/99, p. 62)
"...a delightful composite of 16 songs that gives an even-keeled introduction to his intelligent songwriting and smoothly honed skill on the guitar..."

CMJ (2/1/99, p. 26)
"...Belew's most penetrating pop songs may exude goofiness, tenderness or both....If Belew's altar wasn't so crowded with guitar geeks, singer-songwriter fans would be lining up to praise the guitarist's equally noteworthy talents with the pen."

Track listing
 "The Lone Rhinoceros" (Adrian Belew) – 2:36, original version on Lone Rhino
 "Men In Helicopters" (Belew) – 3:08, original version on Young Lions
 "The Rail Song" (Belew) – 3:42, original version on Twang Bar King
 "Everything" (Belew) – 2:55, original version on Inner Revolution
 "Three of a Perfect Pair" (Belew, Bill Bruford, Robert Fripp, Tony Levin) – 4:08, Recorded live in Argentina 1996, original version on the King Crimson album Three of a Perfect Pair
 "Return of the Chicken" (Belew) – 1:34
 "Never Enough" (Belew) – 3:30, original version on Here
 "The Man in the Moon" (Belew) – 2:11, original version on Lone Rhino
 "I Remember How To Forget" (Belew) – 3:34, original version on Op Zop Too Wah
 "Bad Days" (Belew) – 2:55, original version on Mr. Music Head
 "Fly" (Belew) – 3:54, Recorded live in Argentina 1996, original version on Here
 "Young Lions" (Belew) – 3:06, original version on Young Lions
 "Things You Hit With A Stick" (Belew) – 2:05
 "Cage" (Belew, Bruford, Fripp, Levin, Pat Mastelotto, Trey Gunn) – 2:23, original version on the King Crimson EP Vrooom
 "Dinosaur" (Belew, Bruford, Fripp, Levin, Mastelotto, Gunn) – 5:43 original version on the King Crimson album Thrak
 "One of Those Days" (Belew) – 3:01, original version on Mr. Music Head

Personnel

Musicians
 Adrian Belew – vocals, guitar, additional instrumentation
 Kristin Wilkinson – viola
 John Catchings – cello
 David Davidson, Dave Angell – violins

Technical
 Adrian Belew – producer
 Ken Latchney – engineer
 Noah Evens – engineer
 Kevin Hodge – mastering

References 

Adrian Belew albums
1999 albums
Albums produced by Adrian Belew
Thirsty Ear Recordings albums